WISE J035000.32−565830.2 (designation abbreviated to WISE 0350−5658) is a brown dwarf of spectral class Y1, located in constellation Reticulum, the nearest known star/brown dwarf in this constellation. Being approximately 17.7 light-years from Earth, it is one of the Sun's nearest neighbors.

Discovery
WISE 0350−5658 was discovered in 2012 by J. Davy Kirkpatrick and colleagues from data collected by the Wide-field Infrared Survey Explorer (WISE) in the infrared at a wavelength of 40 cm (16 in), whose mission lasted from December 2009 to February 2011. In 2012, Kirkpatrick et al. published a paper in The Astrophysical Journal, where they presented the discovery of seven new brown dwarfs of spectral type Y that had been found by WISE, among which was WISE 0350−5658.

Distance
WISE 0350−5658 is one of the nearest known brown dwarfs: its trigonometric parallax is 0.184 ± 0.010 arcsecond, corresponding to a direct distance of 5.4 pc (17.7 ly).

See also
The other six discoveries of brown dwarfs, published in Kirkpatrick et al. (2012):
	
WISE 0146+4234 (Y0)
WISE 0359−5401 (Y0)
WISE 0535−7500 (≥Y1)
WISE 0713−2917 (Y0)
WISE 0734−7157 (Y0)
WISE 2220−3628 (Y0)

References

Brown dwarfs
Local Bubble
Y-type stars
Reticulum (constellation)
20120509
WISE objects